Shomrat is a kibbutz in northern Israel. Located in the western Galilee on the coastal highway just north of Acre, it falls under the jurisdiction of Mateh Asher Regional Council.

History
The kibbutz was established on 29 May 1948 by Hashomer Hatzair members from Czechoslovakia, Hungary and Romania on land that had belonged to the depopulated Palestinian village of al-Manshiyya, north of the village site, and also incorporated some land from al-Sumayriyya. Some of the founders had fought with the partisan forces against the Nazis in Europe, while the majority came out of various Nazi concentration camps. Most of the kibbutz founders made their way to Palestine as part of the Aliyah Bet organization, and were consequently interned in DP camps in Cyprus.  The founders originally resided in the agricultural experimental government station near Acre, and moved to the permanent location in 1950. Following an armed attack by a group of Arabs from al-Manshiyya on Shomrat members who were on their way to work at the Na'aman shingle factory in which the kibbutz secretary was killed, Haganah forces were called in to remove the attackers. 

The kibbutz is located in the area of the Tribe of Asher, and is named after Shomer, one of Asher's sons. The name is also associated with the name of the Hashomer Hatzair movement to which the founders belonged.

Designer Tzuri Gueta attended secondary school at Shomrat, and his first job was in the kibbutz knitting factory.

Economy
In 1993, the kibbutz opened a cotton spinning and knitting factory.

Following the collapse of Shomrat's industrial enterprises at the end of the 1990s, Shomrat reorganized itself on the renewed kibbutz model, instituting a differential pay scale and deep privatization of kibbutz services.

References

External links
Kibbutz Shomrat Official website

Czech-Jewish culture in Israel
Hungarian-Jewish culture in Israel
Kibbutzim
Kibbutz Movement
Populated places established in 1948
Populated places in Northern District (Israel)
Romanian-Jewish culture in Israel
Slovak-Jewish culture in Israel
1948 establishments in Israel